Frank Ryan (1907 - 1948) was an American writer and director of films, best known for his films with Deanna Durbin. In 1942 he was given a producer-director-writer contract at Universal.

Select filmography
A Girl, a Guy, and a Gob (1940) - writer
Obliging Young Lady (1942) - writer
The Mayor of 44th Street (1942) - writer
Call Out the Marines (1942) - director
The Amazing Mrs. Holliday (1943) - writer
Hers to Hold (1943) - director
Can't Help Singing (1944) - writer, director
Patrick the Great (1945) - director
So Goes My Love (1946) - director

References

External links
Frank Ryan at IMDb
Frank Ryan at Letterbox DVD

1907 births
1948 deaths
American film directors